Leo Lutwak (March 27, 1928 - February 23, 2006) was a nutritionist, endocrinologist, and biochemist specializing in bariatrics.  He was a retired medical officer with the Food and Drug Administration (FDA).

Life
Born in The Bronx, Lutwak attended the City College of New York, graduating cum laude, followed by the University of Wisconsin-Madison (master's degree in biochemistry, 1946), the University of Michigan in Ann Arbor (Ph.D. biochemistry 1951), and Yale School of Medicine (M.D. 1956). After working for the National Institute of Arthritis and Metabolic Diseases, he briefly worked in Los Angeles, CA; Akron, OH; and Huntsville, AL. From there he started work with the FDA in 1989. During his time there, he raised early concerns about fen-phen, an anti-obesity treatment found to increase risk of heart disease. He also worked at Cornell University, studying the role of calcium in osteoporosis and the physiological effects of weightlessness. After the death of his first wife, Cecile Kroshinsky, he remarried. His second wife later divorced him. He died in 2006. His surviving family includes his sister and his seven children: Mark, Diane, Paul, Jean, Robert, David, and Aviva.

External links

References

1928 births
2006 deaths
American biochemists
American endocrinologists
American nutritionists
City College of New York alumni
Food and Drug Administration people
People from the Bronx
University of Michigan alumni
University of Wisconsin–Madison College of Letters and Science alumni
Yale School of Medicine alumni